Saginaw Trail is the collective name for a set of connected roads in Southeast and Central Michigan that runs from Detroit to Saginaw through Pontiac and Flint that was originally a tribal foot trail. To drive it today, drivers would follow:
 from Detroit to Birmingham;
Old Woodward Avenue through Birmingham;
 from Birmingham to Pontiac;
 into downtown Pontiac;
Former routing of Saginaw Street through downtown within the Woodward Avenue Loop;
 north of the Woodward Avenue Loop;
 north of Pontiac to Clarkston;
Dixie Highway, a set of various county roads that were previously US 10 from Clarkston to near Grand Blanc;
Saginaw Road and Saginaw Street through Grand Blanc, Burton, and Flint to north of Mount Morris;
 from north of Mount Morris near Clio to the Genesee–Saginaw County line;
Dixie Highway and Genesee Avenue into Saginaw.

Historic trails and roads in Michigan
Native American trails in the United States
Transportation in Wayne County, Michigan
Transportation in Saginaw County, Michigan
Transportation in Oakland County, Michigan
Transportation in Genesee County, Michigan
Woodward Avenue
U.S. Route 24
Native American history of Michigan